Lento Violento ...e altre storie is a double CD album by Gigi D'Agostino, released on 27 April 2007.

Track listing

CD 1
Gigi D'Agostino - "E Di Nuovo Cambio Casa"
Gigi D'Agostino - "Impressioni Di Settembre (Bozza Grezza)"
Gigi D'Agostino - "L'Uomo Sapiente"
Gigi D'Agostino - "Gigi's Love (Volando)"
Gigi D'Agostino & Magic Melodien - "Vorrei Fare Una Canzone (Gigi D'Agostino Tanz)"
Gigi D'Agostino - "Ginnastica mentale F.M."
Gigi D'Agostino & The Love Family - "Please Don't Cry (Gigi D'Agostino F.M. Tanz)"
Lento Violento Man - "Passo Folk"
Gigi D'Agostino - "Lo Sbaglio (Orgoglio Mix)"
Gigi D'Agostino - "Arcobaleno"
Gigi D'Agostino & Ludo Dream - "Solo In Te (Gigi D'Agostino F.M. Trip)"
Gigi D'Agostino - "Ho Fatto Un Sogno (F.M.)"
Gigi D'Agostino - "Gioco Armonico"
Gigi D'Agostino & The Love Family - "Viaggetto"
Gigi D'Agostino & The Love Family - "Stand by Me (Gigi D'Agostino & Luca Noise Trip)"
Dimitri Mazza & Gigi D'Agostino - "Il Cammino (Gigi D'Agostino F.M. Tanz)"
Gigi D'Agostino - "Ginnastica Mentale"
Gigi D'Agostino - "Un Mondo Migliore"
Gigi D'Agostino - "Lo Sbaglio (Teatro Mix)"

CD 2
Gigi D'Agostino - "Ininterrottamente"
Lento Violento Man - "Capatosta"
Lento Violento Man - "Pietanza"
Lento Violento Man - "Oscillazione Dag"
Lento Violento Man - "Passo Felino"
Lento Violento Man - "Endis"
La Tana Del Suono - "Tira E Molla"
Lento Violento Man - "Raggi Uonz"
Lento Violento Man - "La Batteria Della Mente"
Lento Violento Man - "Passo Folk (Marcia Tesa)"
Lento Violento Man - "Legna Degna (F.M.)"
Lento Violento Man - "Tordo Sordo"
Gigi D'Agostino & The Love Family - "Please Don't Cry (Gigi D'Agostino Tanz)"
Gigi D'Agostino - "Ho Fatto Un Sogno"
Gigi D'Agostino - "Un Mondo Migliore (B Side)"
Gigi D'Agostino - "Voyage (Assaggio Mix)"

External links
 

2007 albums
Gigi D'Agostino albums